= Salwa al-Raf'i =

Egyptian novelist and screenwriter

Salwa al-Raf'i (born 1942) is an Egyptian novelist and screenwriter.

Al-Raf'i received her bachelor's degree in 1967 from the Institute of Dramatic Arts; in 1989 she received another, in screenwriting, from the Film Institute. Some of her work has been translated into French. She has published several novels and screenplays for films and television.
